Kilskeery is a small village and civil parish in County Tyrone, Northern Ireland. It is between Ballinamallard and Trillick. In the 2001 census it had a population of 57 people. Kilskeery is within the Omagh District Council area.

The Ballinamallard River flows through the village towards Lough Erne. The village has two graveyards within its boundaries. The "old" graveyard surrounded by stone walls has graves from the 19th century.

Schools 
 Queen Elizabeth II Primary School and the Free Presbyterian School.

Layout 

The village is headed at the north by the local Church of Ireland church standing on top of a hill overlooking the village, at over 400 years old it once was overnight refuge for the famous King William of Orange. A few years ago uplighting was added around the church making it an amazing sight when it gets dark. The church has a tower with a bell that can be heard for miles around, and is used on Sunday mornings. The Church is surrounded by what is referred to as the 'new' graveyard and just behind the church is the Sunday school rooms, built quite recently to accommodate the expanding Sunday school classes.

Behind the church grounds is the local primary school, the Queen Elizabeth II. It has two classrooms and a dining hall, outside is the playing field and the school garden.
The row of houses leading southwards from the church is called Beatty Terrace, a row of medium-sized semi detached houses which originally had the same floor plans but due to renovation work now differ slightly.

Opposite Beatty Terrace is the Church hall, on the same site as the old Church hall the new building is larger and better equipped than the old one as it has a larger hall, kitchen and an upstairs meeting room.

At the end of Beatty Terrace there is the village green, a grassy area with some trees scattered through it and benches which on a sunny day attract travellers to stop and have a picnic.

Just behind the green is the 'old' graveyard, which is accessible to the public and conveys the history of the village.
The village extends out the Irvinestown road and at the cross can be found the post office, further out there is another group of houses called Armstrong villas.

In 2008 the village got a 30 mph speed limit which pleased many of the residents, especially those with young children who walk to school.

The local church is the Church of Ireland with a graveyard surrounding it. On the other side of road is the village hall.

The coming of the railways
Kilskeery is near Bundoran Junction railway station which was the junction of the Enniskillen and Bundoran Railway and the Londonderry and Enniskillen Railway.

It was extended Bundoran, Co. Donegal in 1868 and intended to continue to  but failed to do so. The Great Northern Railway ran the E&BR from 1876 and took it over in 1896.

The Sligo, Leitrim and Northern Counties Railway (SL&NCR) Company was incorporated in 1875, and its construction started at a junction with the Great Northern Railway (GNR) at Enniskillen and proceeded westwards. The E&BR accepted defeat and in 1878 Parliament passed an Act allowing it to abandon its commitment to extend to Sligo from Bundoran. The SL&NCR adopted as its company seal a picture of two steam locomotives colliding, with one derailed and the other remaining on the track. This commemorated the SL&NCR's success in reaching Sligo (in 1881) and the E&BR's failure to do the same.

See also
List of civil parishes of County Tyrone

References 

 NI Neighbourhood Information System

Villages in County Tyrone
Civil parishes of County Tyrone